Parvibaculum hydrocarboniclasticum is an aerobic bacterium species from the genus of Parvibaculum which has been isolated from hydrothermal fluids from the East Pacific Rise in the Pacific Ocean. Parvibaculum hydrocarboniclasticum can use n-alkanes like octane, dodecane and hexadecane as a sole source for carbon and energy.

References

Further reading

External links 
Type strain of Parvibaculum hydrocarboniclasticum at BacDive -  the Bacterial Diversity Metadatabase

Bacteria described in 2012